Club Deportivo Binissalem is a Spanish football team based in Binissalem, in the autonomous community of the Balearic Islands. Founded in 1914 it plays in Tercera División, holding home games at Estadio Miquel Pons, which holds 2,000 spectators.

Season to season

1 season in Segunda División B
36 seasons in Tercera División

Honours
Copa Federación de España: 2012

References

External links
Futbolme team profile 
FFIB team profile 

 
Football clubs in the Balearic Islands
Sport in Mallorca
Association football clubs established in 1914
1914 establishments in Spain